Bidens mauiensis, common names Maui beggarticks and ko`oko`olau, is a herb in the family Asteraceae.

Distribution
This plant grows in Maui, Hawaii, United States.

References

External links

mannii
Endemic flora of Hawaii
Biota of Maui
Plants described in 1920
Taxa named by Asa Gray